Leo is a 2002 British-American drama film directed by Mehdi Norowzian and starring Elisabeth Shue, Joseph Fiennes, Dennis Hopper and Sam Shepard.

Cast
Joseph Fiennes as Stephen
Elisabeth Shue as Mary Bloom
Justin Chambers as Ryan Eames
Deborah Kara Unger as Caroline
Mary Stuart Masterson as Brynne
Jake Weber as Ben Bloom
Dennis Hopper as Horace
Sam Shepard as Vic

References

External links
 
 

American drama films
British drama films
2000s English-language films
2000s American films
2000s British films